The 2007 Crown Royal Presents The Jim Stewart 400 was the tenth race of the 2007 NASCAR Nextel Cup campaign, scheduled to be run on Saturday, May 5, 2007 at Richmond International Raceway in Henrico County, Virginia, just outside the city of Richmond, Virginia's state capital.  Rain postponed the race to the following afternoon.  This race was the second night race of the season and the fourth to use the Car of Tomorrow template.

Naming of the Race
In late 2006, Crown Royal decided to hold a nationwide contest to see who could write a one paragraph essay with a "Crown Worthy" moment, defined as an event so special that it deserves to be toasted with said sponsor's drink. The winner of the contest was Jim Stewart  of Houma, Louisiana, who had the race named in his honor, and this contest was so popular that the "Your Name Here" 400 contest  continued in 2008.

End of a streak
Dale Jarrett, driving the #44 Toyota Camry, failed to qualify for this race, marking the first time in 424 races that he failed to make a Cup Series event, last missing the field in October 1994 at North Wilkesboro Speedway.  Jarrett was hamstrung by a new rule installed in 2007 that limits past Cup champions to a total of six past champion provisionals, having used all of them through the spring race at Talladega.  In addition, Jarrett drives for Michael Waltrip Racing, which have had problems since Waltrip's #55 team had been penalized severely during the qualifying for the 2007 Daytona 500.  Toyotas as a whole have not fared well in their maiden season through this point in the year compared to Dodge, Chevrolet and Ford.  Only once has a Toyota driver finished in the top 10 of any race (Brian Vickers at the Auto Club 500 at California Speedway).

The Race

Jimmie Johnson was the race winner.  It was his fourth win of the year, leading all drivers, and his 27th of his career.  This was another dominating performance for Hendrick Motorsports, with Kyle Busch finishing second and Jeff Gordon coming in fourth.

As stated in the opening paragraph, the Jim Stewart 400 was run on Sunday afternoon, May 6 after the scheduled May 5 date was rained out.  On that night, the cars ran 12 laps under green-yellow flags before the rain got heavier.  The storm never relented, the race was postponed, and those laps were wiped out.  The resumption covered all 400 laps.

Race notes
The race, the first major professional sports event in the Commonwealth of Virginia since the Virginia Tech massacre, was dedicated to the victims of the shootings.  Most drivers wore caps with the college's athletic logo, the Fox Sports broadcasters wore pins with the VT logo, and NASCAR announced a contribution of $160,000 to the Hokie Spirit Memorial Fund.  After the race, Johnson drove around the track carrying one of the VT hats; Darian Grubb, the crew chief for the #25 team, was car chief for Johnson during his 2006 championship season and crew chief for his Daytona 500 and UAW-DaimlerChrysler 400 wins because of Chad Knaus' ejection and suspension, is a graduate of the college.
It was the first daytime race at Richmond since May 2002, which was also due to a postponement.
The Fox-owned station in Detroit, WJBK, showed the start of the rescheduled race live, but cut off the broadcast at 2:30 p.m. US EDT to honor an earlier commitment to show the Tigers' Major League Baseball game in Kansas City (produced by Fox Sports Net Detroit).  The rest of the Jim Stewart 400 showed locally in a late-night time slot. Meanwhile, in Las Vegas, local affiliate KVVU joined the race coverage 10 minutes in, but the green flag had not yet dropped at that point. On the other hand, viewers in the Dallas/Fort Worth Metroplex were spared from this dilemma as the telecast of the Texas Rangers - Toronto Blue Jays game, produced by FSN Southwest, was moved from Fox-owned affiliate KDFW to corporate sibling (and My Network affiliate) KDFI allowing Fox 4 to carry the race.  Because of a switching error, Columbia, SC affiliate WACH joined the race late, at 1:15 PM, just before the start.  The station had been committed to airing a movie, and received angry phone calls demanding the race be joined, which took place just before the green flag waved.

Race results
(*) denotes Rookie of the Year candidate.

Notes and references

External links
Race results
Complete point standings

Crown Royal
Crown Royal
NASCAR races at Richmond Raceway
Crown Royal Presents The Jim Stewart 400